Gustl is both a German language masculine and feminine given, often a diminutive of the masculine given names Gustav and August, and the feminine given name Augusta. Individuals bearing the name Gustl include: 

Gustl Auninger (born 1955), Austrian motorcycle road racer
Gustl Bayrhammer (1922–1993), German actor
Gustl Berauer (1912–1986), German-Czechoslovakian Nordic combined skier
Gustl French (1909–2004), female Austrian-American painter, printmaker and photographer
Gustl Gstettenbaur (1914–1996), German actor
Gustl Mollath (born 1956), German man involved in unlawful custody case
Gustl Müller (1903–1989), German Nordic combined and cross-country skier

References

Unisex given names
Masculine given names
German masculine given names
German feminine given names